The Council of States is the upper house of the Federal Assembly of Switzerland, with the National Council being the lower house. It comprises 46 members.

Twenty of the country's cantons are represented by two Councillors each. Six cantons, traditionally called "half cantons", are represented by one Councillor each for historical reasons. These are Obwalden, Nidwalden, Basel-Stadt, Basel-Landschaft, Appenzell Ausserrhoden and Appenzell Innerrhoden. The Councillors serve for four years, and are not bound in their vote to instructions from the cantonal authorities.

Electoral system

Under the Swiss Federal Constitution, the mode of election to the Council of States is left to the cantons, the provision being that it must be a democratic method. All cantons now provide for the councilors to be chosen by popular election, although historically it was typically the cantons' legislatures that elected representatives to Bern.

In the first round of voting, candidates must obtain an absolute majority of the vote in order to be elected. If no candidate receives an absolute majority in the first round of voting then a second round is held in which a simple plurality is sufficient to be elected. The top two finishing candidates in the second round are elected.

However, eligibility to vote varies according to the applicable cantonal law. One notable variation is that qualified foreigners may vote in Neuchâtel and Jura, and the minimum voting age is 16 in Glarus.

In all the cantons except  the councillors are elected concurrently with the members of the National Council. In  the representative is elected by the popular assembly during the April before the national vote.

Working languages
In debates, councilors can choose any of the federal languages, usually the one they are most proficient in: German, French, Italian, or Romansh. German (High German) and French are the most frequently used. While the National Council offers simultaneous interpretation for German and French (since 1960) and Italian (since about 2000), the Council of States offers none. Councilors are expected to understand at least two languages, German and French.

Voting
Issues before the council pass with a majority of the votes cast.  The president of the council typically does not vote, unless there is a tie.  In three cases,  votes require a majority in both councils in order to pass: emergency legislation, votes on subsidies, guarantees, or any expenditure of more than 20 million CHF on a non-recurring basis, or 2 million CHF on a recurring basis.  In any case, where a majority of the council is required, the president of the council will vote.

Until 2014, votes in the chamber were conducted with members raising their hands to be counted.  After Politnetz, a Swiss political information platform, recorded a 2012 vote regarding an import ban on reptile skins, it found that the official vote count differed from what was shown in the video.  In what was called "Stöckligate", Politnetz, shows that several votes on the matter all resulted in miscounts.  (The name Stöckligate refers to a colloquial name for the Council of States. A stöckli is a second home built on a farm for the elder farmer after the property has been deeded to the heirs. The name is applied to the chamber as it is viewed as having older members than the National Council.).  As a result of the affair, council member This Jenny introduced a bill to require electronic voting.

Since 1 March 2014, votes in the Council of states are conducted electronically with a tally shown on electronic display boards. The rule changes also allowed for disclosure of how members voted. The recorded votes are made public for votes on overall bills, final votes, or votes that require a qualified majority. Names and votes will be published if 10 members make the request.

Membership

Council members earn a base salary of 26,000 CHF per year plus a 440 CHF per diem for attending sessions of the council or the committees.  Members also receive 33,000 CHF per year for staff and material expenses.  Members also receive food, travel and hotel allowances and a pension contribution. The Swiss government estimates that a member typically receives 130,000 to 150,000 CHF per year.

Seats by party

|-
!style="background-color:#E9E9E9;text-align:left;" colspan=2| Parties
!style="background-color:#E9E9E9;text-align:left;" | Ideology
!style="background-color:#E9E9E9;text-align:right;"| 2003
!style="background-color:#E9E9E9;text-align:right;"| 2007
!style="background-color:#E9E9E9;text-align:right;"| 2011
!style="background-color:#E9E9E9;text-align:right;"| 2015
!style="background-color:#E9E9E9;text-align:right;"| 2019
|-
| width=5px style="background-color: " |
| style="text-align:left;" |Christian Democratic People's Party (CVP/PDC)
| style="text-align:left;" | Christian democracy
| style="text-align:right;" | 15
| style="text-align:right;" | 15
| style="text-align:right;" | 13
| style="text-align:right;" | 13
| style="text-align:right;" | 13
|-
| style="background-color: " |
| style="text-align:left;" |FDP.The Liberals (FDP/PRD)
| style="text-align:left;" | Classical liberalism
| style="text-align:right;" | 14
| style="text-align:right;" | 12
| style="text-align:right;" | 11
| style="text-align:right;" | 13
| style="text-align:right;" | 12
|-
| style="background-color: " |
| style="text-align:left;" |Social Democratic Party (SPS/PSS)
| style="text-align:left;" | Social democracy
| style="text-align:right;" | 9
| style="text-align:right;" | 9
| style="text-align:right;" | 11
| style="text-align:right;" | 12
| style="text-align:right;" | 9
|-
| style="background-color: " |
| style="text-align:left;" |Swiss People's Party (SVP/UDC)
| style="text-align:left;" | National conservatism
| style="text-align:right;" | 8
| style="text-align:right;" | 7
| style="text-align:right;" | 5
| style="text-align:right;" | 5
| style="text-align:right;" | 6
|-
| style="background-color: " |
| style="text-align:left;" |Green Party (GPS/PES)
| style="text-align:left;" | Green politics
| style="text-align:right;" | 
| style="text-align:right;" | 2
| style="text-align:right;" | 2
| style="text-align:right;" | 1
| style="text-align:right;" | 5
|-
| style="background-color: " |
| style="text-align:left;" |Green Liberal Party (GLP/PVL)
| style="text-align:left;" | Green liberalism
| style="text-align:right;" | 
| style="text-align:right;" | 1
| style="text-align:right;" | 2
| style="text-align:right;" | 
| style="text-align:right;" | 
|-
| style="background-color: " |
| style="text-align:left;" |Conservative Democratic Party (BDP/PBD)
| style="text-align:left;" | Conservatism / Economic liberalism
| style="text-align:right;" | 
| style="text-align:right;" | 
| style="text-align:right;" | 1
| style="text-align:right;" | 1
| style="text-align:right;" | 
|-
| style="background-color: " |
| style="text-align:left;" |Independent
| style="text-align:left;" | Independent
| style="text-align:right;" | 
| style="text-align:right;" | 
| style="text-align:right;" | 1
| style="text-align:right;" | 1
| style="text-align:right;" | 1
|-
|style="text-align:left;background-color:#E9E9E9" colspan=3|Total
|width="30" style="text-align:right;background-color:#E9E9E9"| 46
|width="30" style="text-align:right;background-color:#E9E9E9"| 46
|width="30" style="text-align:right;background-color:#E9E9E9"| 46
|width="30" style="text-align:right;background-color:#E9E9E9"| 46
|width="30" style="text-align:right;background-color:#E9E9E9"| 46
|}

Population per seat
The Council of States represents the federal nature of Switzerland: seats are distributed by state (canton), not by population. Most cantons send 2 representatives, while the historic half-cantons; Appenzell Ausserrhoden, Appenzell Innerrhoden, Obwalden, Nidwalden, Basel-Stadt and Basel-Landshaft, each send one. Consequently, the number of people represented by a single seat in the Council of State varies by a factor of 45.8, from 16,000 for the half-canton of Appenzell Innerrhoden to 733,050 for each of the two seats for the canton of Zurich.

Notes: ¹ Population data from 2015. ² Relative representation compared to Zürich.

Notes and references

Notes

See also
 List of members of the Swiss Council of States (2019–2023)
 List of presidents of the Swiss Council of States
 Cantonal Council

References

Bibliography

External links

Official website—
The Swiss Parliament—
The Law Collection: SR 17 Bundesbehörden/Autorités fédérales/Autorità federali—

 
.
 01
Switzerland)